State Trunk Highway 49 (often called Highway 49, STH-49 or WIS 49) is a state highway in the U.S. state of Wisconsin. It runs north–south in central and southeast Wisconsin from Wittenberg to Lomira. The highway was initially designated in 1917, but it had not been extended to its current length until the 1950s.

Route description
WIS 49 begins at an interchange with Interstate 41 (I-41) north of Lomira and runs west from it, passing through Brownsville before curving to the north to meet the Dodge-Fond du Lac county line. After an interchange with US 151, WIS 49 runs through Waupun. Shortly after exiting Waupun, the highway curves and starts running north to Brandon. Shortly after exiting Brandon, the highway runs concurrently with WIS 44. This concurrency ends in Ripon, where a concurrency with WIS 23 begins. The highway runs north from the concurrent alignment shortly before it reaches Green Lake. While running north, WIS 49 runs through Berlin and many smaller communities before reaching an interchange at US 10.

The highway runs concurrently with US 10, which is a freeway for most of its length. The highway passes by Weyauwega and the Waupaca Municipal Airport before leaving the concurrency and running through Waupaca. After exiting Waupaca, it runs north to Scandinavia and then to Iola, where the highway enters runs concurrently for a short distance with WIS 161. WIS 49 then runs northwesterly to WIS 66 before continuing north, passing through an intersection with WIS 153 in Elderon before terminating at WIS 29.

History
When Wisconsin's state trunk highways were first designated in 1917, the highway ran from WIS 23 near Green Lake to WIS 18 (by 1930, this had become US 10) south of Waupaca. In the early 1920s, WIS 49 was extended south to Waupun. By 1930, the highway had been extended to its current northern terminus at WIS 29, and it was paved south of Poy Sippi (between WIS 21 and US 10). In 1933, the section between Poy Sippi and US 10 was paved. Sometime between 1948 and 1956, the highway had been extended to US 41 (now I-41/US 41). The extension was mostly paved but contained an unpaved section west of Brownsville.

Major junctions

See also

References

External links

049
Transportation in Dodge County, Wisconsin
Transportation in Fond du Lac County, Wisconsin
Transportation in Green Lake County, Wisconsin
Transportation in Waushara County, Wisconsin
Transportation in Waupaca County, Wisconsin
Transportation in Portage County, Wisconsin
Transportation in Marathon County, Wisconsin